William Edward Perdue III (born August 29, 1965) is an American former professional basketball player in the National Basketball Association (NBA). He was a member of four NBA championship teams, three with the Chicago Bulls (1991–1993) and one with the San Antonio Spurs (1999). Perdue is now a Studio analyst for NBC Sports Chicago during their pre-game and post-game Chicago Bulls broadcasts.

Biography 
Perdue attended Merritt Island High School in Merritt Island, Florida

College 
He played college basketball for the Vanderbilt Commodores, where he was named a third-team All-American and named the Southeastern Conference Player of the Year and SEC Male Athlete of the Year in 1988.

Professional career 
He was selected by the Chicago Bulls with the 11th overall pick in the 1988 NBA draft. The Bulls won three championships from 1991–1993 during Perdue's career. Perdue was mainly a backup to center Bill Cartwright. He became a regular starter during the 1994–95 NBA season, during which he averaged 8.0 points and 6.7 rebounds per game.

The emergence of Luc Longley made him expendable, and before the next season's training camp, the Bulls traded him to the San Antonio Spurs for Dennis Rodman. The Spurs won the NBA championship in 1999, Perdue's fourth.

In August 1999, Perdue rejoined the Bulls as a free agent. He started 15 of 67 games for them in 1999–2000, averaging 2.5 points and 3.9 rebounds. After the 1999–2000 season, Perdue left Chicago and signed with the Portland Trail Blazers, where he averaged 1.3 points, 1.4 rebounds and 4.5 minutes in 13 games. He averaged 4.7 points and 4.9 rebounds per game over a thirteen-year career.

References

External links 
Career statistics at basketball-reference.com

1965 births
Living people
All-American college men's basketball players
American men's basketball players
Basketball players from Florida
Centers (basketball)
Chicago Bulls draft picks
Chicago Bulls players
College basketball announcers in the United States
National Basketball Association broadcasters
People from Melbourne, Florida
Portland Trail Blazers players
San Antonio Spurs players
Vanderbilt Commodores men's basketball players